The players draft for the sixth edition of the 2021 Pakistan Super League, which is the franchise T20 cricket league of Pakistan, took place on 10 January 2021. Before the draft, the teams were allowed to retain a maximum of 8 players and make any transfers that they saw necessary. More than 400 players from over 20 different countries featured at the draft. From these players, the teams each selected 16 players along with 2 extra supplementary players to complete their 18 man squads. The draft was completed one month before the main tournament the 2021 Pakistan Super League (2021 PSL) started, in late February. Due to the suspension of the tournament because of COVID-19, a replacement draft was held.

Background
The Pakistan Cricket Board (PCB) announced that the two-time champions Islamabad United would have the first pick, this was decided by a random draw. Before the draft, the PCB announced the renewal categories for all Pakistani players who played in the previous season. Soon after, the list of overseas players was released. Luke Ronchi was released from Islamabad United squad as he was announced as unable to participate due to his new role as New Zealand batting coach.

Transfer and trade
On 9 January 2021, Alex Hales was announced as transferring from Karachi Kings to Islamabad United in exchange of Colin Ingram, who went the other way.

Retained players
On 9 January 2021, the PCB announced the retention players list. All the teams were allowed to retain a maximum of 8 players from the previous season.

Draft picks
The draft took place on 10 January and over 400 players from 20 different countries registered.  Islamabad United, the two-time champions, got the first pick in the opening round of the draft choosing wildcard Hasan Ali. Islamabad United were followed by Multan Sultans (second), Lahore Qalandars (third), Peshawar Zalmi (fourth), Quetta Gladiators (fifth) and Karachi Kings (sixth). After the draft, Shoaib Malik was involved in a car crash. He was said to be "perfectly all right". 
The category salaries were as follows:
Platinum: -
Diamond: -  
Gold: -
Silver: -
Emerging:   
Supplementary: 

Source:

Replacements
Following players were replaced in PSL replacement draft.

Replacement Draft
In April 2021, the replacement draft for the postponed 2021 PSL took place.

Mini Replacement Draft 
After the 2021 PSL was once again postponed from May to June 2021, there was a Mini Replacement Draft.

Replacement after partially

References

External links
 

Cricket in Pakistan
Pakistan Super League player drafts
2021 Pakistan Super League
/